Lens Records is a Chicago-based record label founded by Robert Hyman. The label has released a variety of work in different genres.

Artist roster

 Ahab Rex
 Avagami
 Beehatch
 Dead Voices on Air
 Delicate Noise
 The Division
 Emulsion
 Encomiast
 Melter
 Miss Autopsy
 Mr Russia
 Press
 Rapoon
 Reptilica
 Robert Scott Thompson

References

External links
 Official Site
 Lens Records on myspace
www.simonwhetham.co.uk

American independent record labels
Record labels established in 1999
Alternative rock record labels
1999 establishments in Illinois